The Living City is a 1953 American short documentary film about Chicago, by Haskell Wexler and John Barnes. It was nominated for an Academy Award for Best Documentary Short.

References

External links

The Living City at The Travel Film Archive

1953 films
1953 short films
1953 documentary films
American short documentary films
1950s short documentary films
Documentary films about Chicago
1950s English-language films
1950s American films